Miss India Worldwide 2009 was the 18th edition of the international beauty pageant. The final was held in Durban, South Africa on  February 14, 2009. About 20 countries were represented in the pageant. Nikkitasha Marhawa of the United States was crowned as the winner at the end of the event.

Results

Special awards

Delegates

 – Kanchan Verma
 – Jenai Kavarana
 – Gauravi Shah
 – Naziah Ali
 – Padmini Renata Rambalak
 – Deepthi Mary Varughese
 – Habreen Kaur
 – Melissa Debok
 – Avanthi Patel
 – Sunaina Nadiya Bhoendie
 – Jannat Kaur
 – Shruti Dilip
 – Kubra Sait
 – Asmaa Pandit
 – Kasrivia Nagesar
 – Pamela Mangroelal
 – Gurpreet Kaur
 – Rashmi Premaney
 – Poonam Mehmi
 – Nikkitasha Marhawa

References

External links
http://www.worldwidepageants.com/

2009 beauty pageants